Dariusz is a male given name, predominantly in Polish. Etymologically, it derives from the Proto-Slavic "dar" gift, and signifies the giver/gift giver or possessors as well as "goods", and Persian name Dariush, meaning "he possesses" or "good".

Given name

A
Dariusz Adamczuk (born 1969), Polish footballer
Dariusz Adamczyk (born 1966), Polish-German historian
Dariusz Adamus (born 1957), Polish javelin thrower

B
Dariusz Baliszewski (1946–2020), Polish historian
Dariusz Banasik (born 1973), Polish football manager
Dariusz Baranowski (born 1972), Polish cyclist
Dariusz Batek (born 1986), Polish cyclist
Dariusz Bayer (born 1964), Polish footballer
Dariusz Białkowski (born 1970), Polish canoeist
Dariusz Biczysko (born 1962), Polish high jumper
Dariusz Bladek (born 1994), Canadian football player
Dariusz Brytan (born 1967), Polish footballer
Dariusz Brzozowski (born 1980), Polish drummer

C
Dariusz Czykier (born 1966), Polish footballer

D
Dariusz Doliński (born 1959), Polish psychologist
Dariusz Drągowski (born 1970), Polish footballer
Dariusz Drelich (born 1967), Polish businessman
Dariusz Dudala (born 1963), Polish footballer
Dariusz Dudek (born 1975), Polish footballer
Dariusz Dudka (born 1983), Polish footballer
Dariusz Dziekanowski (born 1962), Polish footballer
Dariusz Dźwigała (born 1969), Polish footballer

F
Dariusz Formella (born 1995), Polish footballer
Dariusz Fornalak (born 1965), Polish footballer

G
Dariusz Gajewski (born 1964), Polish film director
Dariusz Garbocz (born 1971), Polish ice hockey player
Dariusz Gawin (born 1964), Polish historian
Dariusz Gęsior (born 1969), Polish footballer
Dariusz Gilman (born 1973), Polish-American sabre fencer
Dariusz Gładyś (born 1969), Polish footballer
Dariusz Gnatowski (1961–2020), Polish actor
Dariusz Góral (born 1991), Polish footballer
Dariusz Goździak (born 1962), Polish pentathlete
Dariusz Grabowski (born 1950), Polish politician
Dariusz Grzesik (born 1966), Polish footballer
Dariusz Grzywiński (born 1969), Polish wrestler

J
Dariusz Jabłoński (disambiguation), multiple people
Dariusz Jackiewicz (born 1973), Polish footballer
Dariusz Jarecki (born 1981), Polish footballer
Dariusz Jemielniak (born 1975), Polish professor
Dariusz Joński (born 1979), Polish politician

K
Dariusz Kałuża (born 1967), Polish clergyman
Dariusz Karłowicz (born 1964), Polish philosopher
Dariusz Antoni Kłeczek (born 1957), Polish politician
Dariusz Kłus (born 1981), Polish footballer
Dariusz Kofnyt (born 1964), Polish footballer
Dariusz Kołodziej (born 1982), Polish footballer
Dariusz Kołodziejczyk (born 1962), Polish historian
Dariusz Koseła (born 1970), Polish footballer
Dariusz Koszykowski (born 1972), Polish canoeist
Dariusz Kotwica (born 1986), Polish serial killer
Dariusz Kowaluk (born 1996), Polish sprinter
Dariusz Kozłowski (born 1968), Polish biathlete
Dariusz Kozubek (born 1975), Polish footballer
Dariusz Kubicki (born 1963), Polish footballer
Dariusz Kuć (born 1985), Polish sprinter
Dariusz Kulesza (born 1987), Polish speed skater

L
Dariusz Łatka (born 1978), Polish footballer
Dariusz Libionka (born 1963), Polish historian
Dariusz Lipiński (born 1955), Polish politician
Dariusz Ludwig (born 1955), Polish decathlete

M
Dariusz Małecki (born 1975), Polish field hockey player
Dariusz Marciniak (1966–2003), Polish footballer
Dariusz Marcinkowski (born 1975), Polish field hockey player
Dariusz Marzec (born 1969), Polish footballer
Dariusz Michalak (born 1966), Polish footballer
Dariusz Michalczewski (born 1968), Polish boxer
Dariusz Miłek (born 1968), Polish businessman

N
Dariusz Nowak (born 1978), Polish rower
Dariusz Nowakowski (born 1953), Polish judoka

O
Dariusz Olszewski (born 1967), Polish politician
Dariusz Osuch (born 1969), Polish weightlifter

P
Dariusz Pasieka (born 1965), Polish footballer
Dariusz Pawłoś (born 1969), Polish diplomat
Dariusz Pawłowski (born 1999), Polish footballer
Dariusz Pawlusiński (born 1977), Polish footballer
Dariusz Pender (born 1974), Polish fencer
Dariusz Pietrasiak (born 1980), Polish footballer
Dariusz Piontkowski (born 1964), Polish politician
Dariusz Płatek (born 1966), Polish ice hockey player
Dariusz Podolski (born 1966), Polish footballer
Dariusz Popiela (born 1985), Polish canoeist

R
Dariusz Raczyński (born 1962), Polish footballer
Dariusz Radosz (born 1986), Polish rower
Dariusz Ratajczak (1962–2010), Polish historian
Dariusz Rekosz (born 1970), Polish author
Dariusz Romuzga (born 1971), Polish footballer
Dariusz Rosati (born 1946), Polish professor
Dariusz Rzeźniczek (born 1968), Polish footballer

S
Dariusz Sęk (born 1986), Polish boxer
Dariusz Seliga (born 1969), Polish politician
Dariusz Sikora (born 1958), Polish ice hockey player
Dariusz Skrzypczak (born 1967), Polish footballer
Dariusz Śledź (born 1969), Polish motorcycle speedway rider
Dariusz Slowik (born 1977), Polish-Canadian discus thrower
Dariusz Snarski (born 1968), Polish boxer
Dariusz Sośnicki (born 1969), Polish poet
Dariusz Stachowiak (born 1984), Polish politician
Dariusz Stalmach (born 2005), Polish footballer
Dariusz Stanicki (born 1965), Polish volleyball player
Dariusz Stola (born 1963), Polish historian
Dariusz Świercz (born 1994), Polish-American chess player
Dariusz Świerczewski (1936–2005), Polish basketball player
Dariusz Szczerbal (born 1995), Polish footballer
Dariusz Szlachetko (born 1961), Polish botanist
Dariusz Szpakowski (born 1951), Polish sports commentator
Dariusz Sztylka (born 1978), Polish footballer
Dariusz Szubert (born 1970), Polish footballer
Dariusz Szwed (born 1967), Polish politician

T
Dariusz Trafas (born 1972), Polish javelin thrower
Dariusz Trela (born 1989), Polish footballer

U
Dariusz Ulanowski (born 1971), Polish footballer

W
Dariusz Walęciak (born 1979), Polish footballer
Dariusz Wdowczyk (born 1962), Polish footballer
Dariusz Wódke (born 1957), Polish sabre fencer
Dariusz Wojciechowski (born 1968), Polish cyclist
Dariusz Wójtowicz (born 1965), Polish footballer
Dariusz Wolny (disambiguation), multiple people
Dariusz Wolski (born 1956), Polish cinematographer
Dariusz Wosz (born 1969), German football coach
Dariusz Wrzosek (born 1982), Polish canoeist

Z
Dariusz Zakrzewski (born 1961), Polish cyclist
Dariusz Zawadzki (born 1982), Polish footballer
Dariusz Zelig (born 1957), Polish basketball player
Dariusz Zgutczyński (born 1965), Polish footballer
Dariusz Zielke (born 1960), Polish high jumper
Dariusz Zjawiński (born 1986), Polish footballer
Dariusz Żuraw (born 1972), Polish football manager

See Also
Darius (given name), a disambiguation page for people with the given name of Darius

References

Polish masculine given names